The Nicobar flying fox (Pteropus faunulus) is a species of flying fox in the family Pteropodidae. It is endemic to India.  Its natural habitats are subtropical or tropical moist lowland forest and subtropical or tropical swamps. It is threatened by habitat loss due to forest clearing.

Sources

Mammals of India
Pteropus
Mammals described in 1902
Taxonomy articles created by Polbot
Taxa named by Gerrit Smith Miller Jr.
Bats of Asia

Bats of India